The Silver Goblets & Nickalls' Challenge Cup is a rowing event for men's coxless pairs at the annual Henley Royal Regatta on the River Thames at Henley-on-Thames in England.  It is open to male crews from all eligible rowing clubs. Two clubs may combine to make an entry.

History
The Silver Goblets was established in 1850, replacing a previous competition the Silver Wherries. In 1895, Tom Nickalls, father of Guy and Vivian Nickalls presented the Nickalls Challenge Cup to go with the Silver Goblets.

Winners - Silver Wherries

Winners - Silver Goblets

Winners - Silver Goblets & Nickalls' Challenge Cup

See also
Rowing on the River Thames

References

Events at Henley Royal Regatta
Rowing trophies and awards
Recurring events established in 1850